Charles de La Verpillière (born 31 May 1954 in Bourg-en-Bresse, Ain) is a French politician of The Republicans who formerly served as a member of the National Assembly of France, representing the second constituency of the Ain department.

Political career
In the Republicans’ 2016 presidential primaries, de La Verpillière endorsed Bruno Le Maire as the party's candidate for the office of President of France.

Recognition
La Verpillière is a Chevalier of the Legion of Honour as well as a Chevalier of the National Order of Merit.

References

External links
Official website

1954 births
Living people
Politicians from Bourg-en-Bresse
Union for a Popular Movement politicians
The Republicans (France) politicians
Deputies of the 15th National Assembly of the French Fifth Republic
Chevaliers of the Légion d'honneur
Knights of the Ordre national du Mérite
Deputies of the 13th National Assembly of the French Fifth Republic
Deputies of the 14th National Assembly of the French Fifth Republic
Deputies for Ain (French Fifth Republic)
École nationale d'administration alumni